Ophioglossum reticulatum, the netted adder's-tongue, is a species of fern in the family Ophioglossaceae. It has a pantropical/pansubtropical distribution; Latin America, the Caribbean, Sub-Saharan Africa, Madagascar, Yemen, the Indian Subcontinent, Southeast Asia, warmer parts of China, Malesia, Korea, Japan, and many tropical islands. A hexaploid, it has the highest number of chromosomes of any plant, 720. Its leaves—or leaf, individuals only grow one per year—are edible, and are regularly consumed by people in Africa and Asia.

References

reticulatum
Ferns of the Americas
Ferns of Africa
Ferns of Asia
Ferns of Oceania
Flora of Mexico
Flora of Central America
Flora of the Caribbean
Flora of South America
Flora of Cape Verde
Flora of West Tropical Africa
Flora of West-Central Tropical Africa
Flora of Northeast Tropical Africa
Flora of East Tropical Africa
Flora of South Tropical Africa
Flora of the Western Indian Ocean
Flora of Yemen
Flora of the Indian subcontinent
Flora of Indo-China
Flora of Malesia
Flora of China
Flora of Eastern Asia
Flora of the Solomon Islands (archipelago)
Flora of the Tuamotus
Taxa named by Carl Linnaeus
Plants described in 1753